"To Be Free" is a single by musician Mike Oldfield, released in 2002. It is from the album Tr3s Lunas released by Warner Music.  The main vocalist is the Jazz singer Jude Sim.

Track listing 
 All songs by Mike Oldfield.

The Remixes CD 
 "To Be Free" (Single version)
 "To Be Free" (Pumpin' Dolls to the Top Club Mix)
 "To Be Free" (Pumpin' Dolls Argento Dub Mix)
 "To Be Free" (Soultronik Hard Floor Cibervetido Mix)
 "To Be Free" (Soultronik Mix - Tical Mix)

Belgium single 
 "To Be Free" (Pumpin' Dolls Radio Friendly Edit) (3:23)
 "To Be Free" (Radio edit) (3:59)

References 
 

2002 singles
Mike Oldfield songs
Songs written by Mike Oldfield
Warner Music Group singles
2002 songs